John Bradford (fl. 1377–1391), of Leominster, Herefordshire, was an English politician.

He was a Member (MP) of the Parliament of England for Leominster in January 1377, January 1380, 1385 and 1391.

References

14th-century births
Year of death missing
English MPs January 1377
English MPs January 1380
English MPs 1385
English MPs 1391
14th-century English politicians
People from Herefordshire